The 1995 New Zealand rugby league tour of Great Britain was a tour by the New Zealand national rugby league team to compete at the 1995 Rugby League World Cup. New Zealand won Group B of the tournament, before losing to Australia 20-30 in a semi-final.

Build up
Earlier in the year, New Zealand played two test matches against France, winning one and drawing the other. New Zealand then played a three match test series against Australia, losing all three tests.

Staff
Head coach: Frank Endacott
Assistant coach: Gary Kemble

Squad

Final squad

Fixtures

Warm up match

Before leaving for the World Cup, the squad played the New Zealand Residents at Ericsson Stadium and defeated them 20-4.

World Cup Group B

Tonga

Papua New Guinea

Semi-final

The match was 20-all after 80 minutes. In extra time Australia scored two tries to win the match.

References

1995 Rugby League World Cup
Great Britain